Pethia pookodensis is a species of cyprinid fish found in Kerala, India where it is only known to occur in Pookode Lake in the Western Ghats.  This species can reach a length of  SL.  The high level of tourism around the lake poses serious threats to its ecosystem.

References 

Pethia
Taxa named by T. V. Anna Mercy
Taxa named by Jacob Eapen
Fish described in 2007
Barbs (fish)